Exoristini is a tribe of flies in the family Tachinidae.

Genera
Atylomyia Brauer, 1898
Austrophorocera Townsend, 1916
Bessa Robineau-Desvoidy, 1863
Calliethilla Shima, 1979
Chaetexorista Brauer & Bergenstamm, 1895
Chetogena Rondani, 1856
Diplostichus Brauer & Bergenstamm, 1889
Ethilla Robineau-Desvoidy, 1863
Exorista Meigen, 1803
Gueriniopsis Reinhard, 1943
Gynandromyia Bezzi, 1923
Parasetigena Brauer & Bergenstamm, 1891
Paratryphera Brauer & von Bergenstamm, 1891
Phorcidella Mesnil, 1946
Phorocera Robineau-Desvoidy, 1830
Phorocerosoma Townsend, 1927
Tachinomyia Townsend, 1892

References

Diptera of Asia
Diptera of North America
Diptera of Europe
Exoristinae